Maria Luisa Della Noce (28 April 1923 – 15 May 2008) was an Italian actress. She was perhaps best known for her roles in the films The Railroad Man (1956) and Juliet of the Spirits (1965).

Filmography

References

External links
 

1923 births
2008 deaths
Italian film actresses